Dasymys is a genus of semiaquatic rodents in the subfamily Murinae, the Old World rats and mice. The genus is endemic to Africa.

These rats are wetland habitat specialists, occurring in marshy areas with wet ground and thick vegetation, such as swamps and vleis. They swim well. They are nocturnal and solitary. Species are more common in the northern regions of Sub-Saharan Africa, likely because their wetland habitat is more degraded in southern regions.

The genus is not well studied and its taxonomy is not clear. The number of species and their relationships have only been tentatively determined.

Species include:
Dasymys alleni – Glover Allen's dasymys
Dasymys cabrali – Crawford-Cabral's dasymys
Dasymys foxi – Fox's shaggy rat
Dasymys incomtus – African marsh rat
Dasymys montanus – Montane shaggy rat
Dasymys nudipes – Angolan marsh rat
Dasymys robertsii - Robert's shaggy rat
Dasymys rufulus – West African shaggy rat
Dasymys rwandae – Rwandan dasymys
Dasymys shortridgei
Dasymys sua – Tanzanian dasymys

References

 
Rodents of Africa
Rodent genera
Taxa named by Wilhelm Peters
Taxonomy articles created by Polbot